Mesaria may refer to:

 Mesaria, Andros, on List of settlements in the Cyclades
 Mesaria, Corfu, community within Agios Georgios, Corfu
 Mesaria, Santorini, subdivision of Santorini

See also 
 Mesarea, historical region of Greece
 Messara (disambiguation)